The following is an incomplete List of bridges and tunnels in Macau, China.

Bridges
As parts of Macau are islands and surrounded by islands in mainland China, bridges are a critical infrastructures in the city.

Bridge-Causeway-Tunnel

Causeways
Macau had one causeway when Coloane and Taipa were separate islands. The roadway was not a bridge, but a road built on top of the water. The two islands have since been infilled and the former causeway is now an inland roadway.

Tunnels
Macau currently has several tunnels. One connects two neighbourhoods on Macau Peninsula cutoff by hills, and one connects Cotai with University of Macau Hengqin Campus. There are also other tunnels on the island of Taipa.

 Túnel da Rotunda do Istmo - connects Avenida Wai Long to Estrada da Baía de Nossa Senhora da Esperança, bypassing the roundabout.
 Túnel de Ká Hó – Coloane (under construction)
 Túnel da Colina de Taipa Grande (planned)

Viaducts
 Avenida do Comendador Ho Yin

References

 
Macau
Bridges
Bridges